Xotodon is an extinct genus of toxodontid mammal that lived during the Late Miocene (Huayquerian in the SALMA classification) in Argentina, South America. Fossils of Xotodon have been found in the Ituzaingó, Maimará and Chiquimil Formations of Argentina.

References 

Toxodonts
Miocene mammals of South America
Huayquerian
Neogene Argentina
Fossils of Argentina
Ituzaingó Formation
Fossil taxa described in 1887
Taxa named by Florentino Ameghino
Prehistoric placental genera